This is a list of notable people affiliated with New Mexico State University.

Faculty and staff 
Reta Beebe - professor emeritus in the Astronomy Department, best known for participation in the Voyager mission
David Boje - author; current NMSU endowed Bank of America professor of management
James Cuffey - former professor in astronomy, known for photoelectric photometry
Garrey Carruthers - former NMSU President and Dean of College of Business; former governor of New Mexico
Frank Harary -  mathematician, specialized in graph theory
Delano Lewis - founding director of New Mexico State University's International Relations Institute
Mark Medoff - playwright, screenwriter, film and theatre director, actor, and professor
Antonya Nelson - English professor at NMSU; author
Burl Noggle - professor, American historian
Cyrus Nowrasteh - screenwriter and director
Fred T. Plog, III-archaeologist, anthropologist, author
Gerald W. Thomas - NMSU President Emeritus, 1970–1984
Edward O. Thorp - mathematician best known for writing the book Beat the Dealer and co-inventing the first wearable computer; Associate Professor of Mathematics 1961–65
Clyde Tombaugh - astronomer best known for his discovery of Pluto; former professor of astronomy

Alumni

Science, medicine, and technology 
Arlan Andrews - mechanical engineer and science fiction author
John A. D. Cooper - physician and educator
Stuart Pimm - theoretical ecologist and conservation biologist.
Alan Hale - astronomer famous for discovering the Hale-Bopp Comet
Bill Inmon - computer scientist, recognized as the father of data warehouse
Paul W. Klipsch - audio pioneer; founder of Klipsch and Associates; namesake of the Klipsch School  of Electrical and Computer Engineering at NMSU
Jaron Lanier - writer, computer scientist, composer, and virtual reality pioneer
Kathy Lueders - engineer, NASA Associate Administrator of Human Exploration and Operations (HEO)
Rose Marie Pangborn - scientist, pioneer in the sensory analysis of food
Harold Reitsema - astronomer, part of the teams that discovered Larissa and Telesto
Mark W. Spong - roboticist; Dean of Erik Jonsson School of Engineering & Computer Science at the University of Texas at Dallas
Paul Carpenter Standley - botanist
Sarah Stewart - research scientist, pioneer in the field of viral oncology, co-discovered the first polyomavirus

Law, politics, military and government 
Norma Bixby - member of the Montana House of Representatives
Donald Bratton - politician
William Burt - Republican member of the New Mexico Senate
Michael L. Connor - United States Deputy Secretary of the Interior
David Coss - US politician and former mayor of Santa Fe, New Mexico
Lee Cotter - Republican member of the New Mexico Senate 
Candy Ezzell - Republican member of the New Mexico House of Representatives
Edgar Franklin Foreman, Jr. - motivational speaker in Dallas who served one term in the United States House of Representatives
Gregory J. Fouratt - former United States Attorney for the District of New Mexico
Chuck Franco - game warden, police officer, undersheriff, current First Gentleman of New Mexico
Mary Helen Garcia - Democratic member of the New Mexico House of Representatives
Mary Jane Garcia - former member of the New Mexico Senate
Ron Griggs -  politician
David Campos Guaderrama - United States District Judge for the United States District Court for the Western District of Texas
Gary King - Attorney General of New Mexico
Lester Lyles - former Air Force general, currently Chairman of the Board for USAA
Patrick H. Lyons - politician from New Mexico
John McEneny - politician
Ken Miyagishima - mayor of Las Cruces, New Mexico
Howie Morales - Democratic member of the New Mexico Senate
Steven Neville - Republican member of the New Mexico Senate
Steve Pearce - US Representative for New Mexico
Renee Schulte -  Iowa State Representative
William Sharer - Republican member of the New Mexico Senate
Roosevelt Skerrit - Prime Minister of Dominica Attended but graduated from Mississippi 
William Soules - Democratic member of the New Mexico Senate
 James Edward Wharton - United States Army Brigadier General, killed in action during World War II
Pat Woods - Republican member of the New Mexico Senate
Bob Wooley - Republican member of the New Mexico House of Representatives

Business 
Kevin Johnson - CEO of Starbucks Corporation
Dave Lopez - telecommunications executive

Academia, arts, and literature 
Lee K. Abbott -  writer; professor emeritus of English at Ohio State University
Subhankar Banerjee - photographer, author and activist
Denise Chavez - author, playwright and stage director
Leroy Quintana - poet, Vietnam veteran
Willard Hughes Rollings - author and scholar of Native American history and of the Maori, the indigenous people of New Zealand
Larry Torres - linguist and lecturer on Southwestern culture
Martin Guevara Urbina - writer, professor, and researcher; as a sociologist and criminologist, works on Latina and Latino issues in the United States

Athletics 
Willie Adams - former NFL defensive end
Andre Anderson - former CFL defensive tackle for the BC Lions
Pervis Atkins - NFL running back, played for the Los Angeles Rams, Washington Redskins and Oakland Raiders
Leo Barker - NFL linebacker, played for the Cincinnati Bengals
Greg Bearman - CFL defensive back
Rich Beem -  professional golfer with a three PGA Tour wins including 2002 PGA Championship
Jim Bostic - NBA forward
Randy Brown - NBA guard
Bart Bryant - professional golfer with three PGA Tour wins
Tom Byrum - professional golfer with one PGA Tour win
Joe Campbell - NFL defensive end, played for the New Orleans Saints, Oakland Raiders and Tampa Bay Buccaneers
Steve Colter - NBA guard
Charlie Criss - NBA guard
Andy Dorris - NFL defensive end, played for the St. Louis Cardinals, New Orleans Saints, Seattle Seahawks and Houston Oilers
Andre Francis - former FL defensive back
Bob Gaiters - NFL running back, played for the NY Giants, San Francisco 49ers and Denver Broncos 
Roy Gerela - NFL placekicker, played for the Houston Oilers, Pittsburgh Steelers and San Diego Chargers
Jim Germany - CFL running back, played for the Edmonton Eskimos, was an All-Star and part of 5 Grey Cup championship teams
Jonte Green - NFL cornerback for the Detroit Lions
Duriel Harris - NFL wide receiver, played for the Miami Dolphins
Steve Haskins - professional golfer with two Web.com Tour wins
Lou Henson - former coach of New Mexico State and University of Illinois men's basketball
Davon House - NFL defensive back for the Green Bay Packers
Bobby Humphrey - NFL wide receiver, played for the NY Jets and Denver Broncos
Martin Iti - basketball player
Bob Jackson - former NFL running back
Charley Johnson - NFL quarterback, played for the St. Louis Cardinals, Houston Oilers and Denver Broncos ; full professor of Chemical Engineering at NMSU; member of the Denver Broncos Ring of Honor
Walter Johnson - NFL defensive lineman, played for the Cleveland Browns and Cincinnati Bengals; three-time Pro Bowl (1967, 1968, 1969); member of the College Football Hall of Fame
LaTraia Jones - football coach; former player at University of Wyoming
Reggie Jordan - NBA guard
Sam Lacey - NBA center
Billy Ray Locklin - former CFL defensive lineman
Kerry Locklin - college football coach
Denvis Manns - football running back, famous for rushing for 1,000 yards in four consecutive seasons in college
Anita Maxwell - former WNBA forward for the Cleveland Rockers, only basketball player (male or female) in school history to have her uniform number (40) retired
Kyle Nelson - NFL long snapper
Michael New - former basketball player and coach of the Milton Keynes Lions
Jerry Nuzum - NFL running back, played for the Pittsburgh Steelers
Cliff Olander - gridiron football quarterback
J. R. Patton - stock car racing driver
Buck Pierce - CFL quarterback, played for the BC Lions and Winnipeg Blue Bombers
Joe Pisarcik - NFL quarterback, played for the New York Giants and Philadelphia Eagles; best remembered for his role in a 1978 play that has since been referred to as "The Fumble" by NY Giants fans and "The Miracle at the Meadowlands" by Philadelphia Eagles fans
Ron Porterfield - Major League Baseball athletic trainer 
Tony Sanchez - head football coach at UNLV
Joe Schmiesing - former NFL defensive lineman, played for the St. Louis Cardinals
Siddeeq Shabazz - Canadian Football League linebacker
Alena Sharp - professional golfer on the LPGA Tour
Pascal Siakam - NBA forward,  NBA championship in 2019 with Toronto Raptors
Danny Villanueva - NFL placekicker, played for the Los Angeles Rams and Dallas Cowboys. Media entertainment entrepreneur
Gary Ward - former baseball coach for Oklahoma State University and New Mexico State University
Walt Williams - NFL cornerback, played for the Detroit Lions, Minnesota Vikings and Chicago Bears
John Williamson - NBA guard
Tony Wragge - former NFL offensive lineman for various teams
Jahmar Young (born 1986) - basketball player in the Israeli National League
Fredd Young - NFL linebacker; played for the Seattle Seahawks and Indianapolis Colts; four-time Pro Bowler (1984, 1985, 1986, 1987); two-time All-Pro (1984, 1987); member of the Seattle Seahawks 35th Anniversary Team
Jahmar Young - NBA guard
Jannah Sonnenschein (born 1996) - Dutch–Mozambican swimmer

Entertainment, film, news and television 
Scott Bailey - actor
David James Baker - filmmaker
Baxter Black - cowboy poet; radio and television commentator
Kira Davis - film producer
William Frankfather - actor
Barbara Funkhouser - journalist, first woman to serve as editor of the El Paso Times (1980–1986) 
Alvy Ray Smith - co-founder of Pixar
Brittany Toll - Miss New Mexico 2011
Franc Luz - Movie and Television Actor

Other
Jorge A. Rojas -  general authority of The Church of Jesus Christ of Latter-day Saints (LDS Church)
Clara Belle Williams (1885–1994) - first African-American graduate of the university (English, 1937)

References

External links 
New Mexico State University official website
NMSU Alumni Association official website

New Mexico State University
New Mexico State